Sticteulima kawamurai is a species of sea snail, a marine gastropod mollusk in the family Eulimidae.

References

External links
 Matsuda H., Uyeno D. & Nagasawa K. (2020). Three new species of Hemiliostraca and a redescription of H. conspurcata (Gastropoda: Caenogastropoda: Eulimidae) from Japan, with a revised diagnosis of the genus. Venus. 78(3-4): 71-85

kawamurai
Gastropods described in 1961